The T. Pierson Farm is a historic farm located at Hockessin, New Castle County, Delaware. The property includes three contributing buildings. They are a stone house (c. 1810) with late-19th century frame addition, a stone and frame bank barn (c. 1820), and a mid-19th century frame outbuilding.  The house is a two-story, two-bay, gable-roofed building that is constructed with rubble fieldstone. It has a two-story, three-bay, frame wing to form a five-bay main facade. The barn features a pyramidal-roofed cupola with louvered sides atop the gable roof.

It was added to the National Register of Historic Places in 1986.

References

Farms on the National Register of Historic Places in Delaware
Houses completed in 1810
Houses in New Castle County, Delaware
National Register of Historic Places in New Castle County, Delaware